Piosoma setosum is a species of beetle in the family Carabidae, the only species in the genus Piosoma.

References

Harpalinae